= Football Federation of Guinea-Bissau =

Governing body of football in Guinea-Bissau

CAF
- Founded: 1974
- FIFA affiliation: 1986
- CAF affiliation: 1986
- President: Manuel Nascimento Lopes

The Football Federation of Guinea-Bissau (Portuguese: Federação de Futebol da Guiné-Bissau, FFGB) is the governing body of football in Guinea-Bissau. It was founded in 1974, and affiliated to FIFA and to CAF in 1986. It organizes the national football league and the national team.
